The 1981 NAIA Division I football season was the 26th season of college football sponsored by the NAIA, was the 12th season of play of the NAIA's top division for football.

The season was played from August to November 1981 and culminated in the 1981 NAIA Division I Champion Bowl, played this year on December 19, 1981 at Burlington Memorial Stadium in Burlington, North Carolina (near the campus of Elon College).

Defending national champion Elon defeated Pittsburg State in the Champion Bowl, 3–0, to win their second NAIA national title.

Conference changes
 This is the final season the NAIA officially recognizes a football champion from the Great Lakes Intercollegiate Athletic Conference and the Lone Star Conference. Both the GLIAC and the Lone Star became an NCAA Division II conferences, where both continue to sponsor football (with the exception of a ten-year hiatus for the GLIAC between 1989 and 1999).

Conference standings

Conference champions

Postseason

† Cameron was disqualified after their first round win over Central Arkansas after it was discovered they had been using ineligible players.

See also
 1981 NAIA Division II football season
 1981 NCAA Division I-A football season
 1981 NCAA Division I-AA football season
 1981 NCAA Division II football season
 1981 NCAA Division III football season

References

 
 
NAIA Football National Championship